The Tavern Club is a private social club in the Central neighborhood of Cleveland, Ohio, USA. Its home is a  building designed by architect J. Milton Dyer in a Northern Renaissance style.  It was listed on the National Register of Historic Places in 1984. It was also designated as a landmark by the City of Cleveland. Tavern was built at a time when, just a block away, Cleveland's Millionaire's Row on Euclid Avenue was among the wealthiest neighborhoods in the world, and home to many members. 

Dyer was a member of the Tavern Club, which was established 1892–93.  He designed a building for the group when it moved from a leased property at 968 Prospect Street to its present building on January 1, 1905. Dyer's design was inspired by his admiration of the clubhouses of the Heidelberg University dueling societies. "The exterior construction and the traditional interior decor of the building" have remained essentially the same since the club's beginning.

The upstairs originally contained two squash courts and a rackets court. The Tavern Club Invitational, a Professional Squash Doubles tournament, benefits the youth empowerment through squash program, Urban Squash Cleveland.

See also
 List of American gentlemen's clubs

References

Central, Cleveland
Buildings and structures completed in 1905
Clubs and societies in the United States
Gentlemen's clubs in the United States
Buildings and structures in Cleveland
National Register of Historic Places in Cleveland, Ohio
1905 establishments in Ohio